Theophil Großgebauer (24 November 1627, Ilmenau – 8 July 1661, Rostock) was a German Lutheran theologian active at the University of Rostock, most notable for his work Wächterstimme aus dem verwüsteten Zion.

Sources
http://www.theologie.uni-rostock.de/index.php?id=3551

References 

1627 births
1661 deaths
German Lutheran theologians
17th-century German Protestant theologians
German male non-fiction writers
17th-century German writers
17th-century German male writers